Ulmus parvifolia var. coreana, the Korean elm, is a variety of the Chinese elm Ulmus parvifolia, native to Korea.

Description 
Not available.

Pests and diseases 
No information available.

Cultivation 
The tree is very rare in cultivation in the United States and Europe. There are no known cultivars of this taxon, nor is it known to be in commerce.

Accessions

North America 
 Arnold Arboretum, US. Acc. no. 402-86
 Morton Arboretum, US. Acc. no. 48-86
 United States National Arboretum. No details available.

Europe 
 Grange Farm Arboretum, Lincolnshire, UK. Acc. no. 1087.

External links 
 Morton Arboretum Catalogue 2006

parvifolia var. coreana
Ulmus articles missing images
Elm species and varieties
Taxa named by Takenoshin Nakai